Biser Ivanov (born 24 June 1973 in Sofia) is a retired Bulgarian footballer and coach, who played as a midfielder. Ivanov was nicknamed "The Legend" (Bulgarian: Легендата). 

His career began and ended at Levski Elin Pelin. In between, Ivanov also played for Velbazhd Kyustendil, Chirpan, Spartak Plovdiv, Levski Sofia and Marek Dupnitsa in Bulgaria, Anorthosis in Cyprus, and for the Bulgarian national team.

References

1973 births
Living people
Bulgarian footballers
Bulgarian expatriate footballers
Bulgaria international footballers
FC Spartak Plovdiv players
PFC Levski Sofia players
PFC Marek Dupnitsa players
Anorthosis Famagusta F.C. players
First Professional Football League (Bulgaria) players
Expatriate footballers in Cyprus
Association football midfielders